Blefjell is a mountain area at the border between Buskerud and Telemark in Norway, and encompasses parts of the five municipalities Rollag, Flesberg, Kongsberg, Notodden and Tinn. The highest point is Bletoppen at 1342 meters above sea level.

The area is a popular tourist destination, being approximately 1 hour drive from Kongsberg.

External links 
 Visit Blefjell (in optional language)

 

Mountains of Viken
Mountains of Vestfold og Telemark
Flesberg
Rollag
Kongsberg
Notodden
Tinn